Dean Samuel "Diz" Laird (February 7, 1921 – August 10, 2022) was the only U.S. Navy ace to have combat victories in both the Pacific and European theaters of World War II. He served in World War II, the Korean War, and the Vietnam War, and is given credit for 5.75 aerial victories. Laird flew 138 fighter missions during World War II. and was awarded the Distinguished Flying Cross and the Congressional Gold Medal, among other honors.

Career
One week after the Japanese attack on Pearl Harbor on December 7, 1941, Laird drove to San Francisco to enlist. Laird entered the U.S. Navy cadet program. On August 11, 1942, he became a commissioned officer. In NAS Miami, Florida, on October 21, 1942, he became a Naval Aviator. Laird shot down 5.75 enemy aircraft in combat and he damaged an additional plane. Two of his kills were German planes: A Ju-88 and a He-115 in October 1943 near Norway. The other kills were Japanese planes so Laird has the distinction of being the only Navy ace to have scored air victories against both Germany and Japan. He flew F4F Wildcat and then F6Fs and was assigned from November 1942 to March 1943, to the aircraft carrier USS Ranger (CV-4). November 1944 to March 1945 he was assigned to the USS Essex (CV-9).

In December 1944, Laird was almost shot down. His F6F Hellcat was riddled with bullets over the Philippines, but he was able to pilot the plane back to the USS Essex which was 250 miles away. His landing gear did not work and Laird landed the plane skidding on its bottom across the deck of the aircraft carrier USS Essex.

He received the Distinguished Flying Cross for his actions on February 7, 1945. Laird was escorting bomber planes which were attacking heavily defended Japanese aircraft engine factories. He shot down two Japanese planes during that mission near Tokyo, Japan.

When Laird was 93 years old, he was one of 35 Aces to travel to the nation's capital and receive the Congressional Gold Medal recognizing the 1,450 Aces from all of the wars.

Film
In 1969, Laird was a stunt pilot. He performed many of the stunts in the 20th Century Fox film Tora! Tora! Tora!; he helped choreograph the reenactment of the attack on Pearl Harbor and was the lead stunt pilot. He was one of the three main pilots in the film and he flew approximately 164 hours during production.

Personal life and death
Laird was born in Loomis, California, and grew up in Northern California. In 1958 he moved to Coronado, where he co-owned and operated the Coronado Municipal Golf Course restaurant; in 2015 he moved back north to Walnut Creek to be close to his daughter and her family. He turned 100 in February 2021, and died on August 10, 2022, at the age of 101.

Awards

 Congressional Gold Medal (2015)
 Audie Murphy award presented by the American Veterans Center

Affiliations
He was a member of the American Fighter Aces Association, the Distinguished Flying Cross Society, and the Tailhook Association.

See also
 List of World War II aces from the United States
 List of World War II flying aces

References

Further reading

External links
 Dean Diz Laird
 Commander Laird was recognized as part of the AVC’s Emmy-winning television special American Valor: A Salute to Our Heroes
 Negative Diz, the Pattern is Full

1921 births
2022 deaths
United States Navy pilots of World War II
American World War II flying aces
Military personnel from California
United States Navy officers
Recipients of the Distinguished Flying Cross (United States)
American centenarians
Men centenarians
People from Placer County, California